The ninth series of the British children's television series The Dumping Ground began broadcasting on 11 June 2021 on CBBC and concluded on 25 March 2022. The series follows the lives of the children living in the fictional children's care home of Ashdene Ridge, nicknamed by them "The Dumping Ground". It consists of twenty, thirty-minute episodes. It is the 18th series in The Story of Tracy Beaker franchise (My Mum Tracy Beaker having aired between this and the eighth series). This series is shorter than usual due to the COVID-19 pandemic and substantial delays in filming.

Cast

Main

Guest

Episodes

References

2021 British television seasons
2022 British television seasons
The Dumping Ground